William Horn (born 13 May 1938) is a retired Scottish professional football winger who played in the Scottish League for Kilmarnock, Raith Rovers, Dumbarton, Third Lanark and Clydebank. He also played in the Irish League and the Football League.

Career statistics

References

1938 births
Scottish footballers
English Football League players
Brentford F.C. players
Living people
Footballers from Glasgow
Association football wingers
Kilmarnock F.C. players
Third Lanark A.C. players
Scottish Football League players
Coleraine F.C. players
Bangor F.C. players
NIFL Premiership players
Dumbarton F.C. players
Raith Rovers F.C. players
Clydebank F.C. (1965) players
Kirkintilloch Rob Roy F.C. players